Nancy Byrd Turner (July 29, 1880 – September 5, 1971) was an American poet, editor and lecturer. She was a recipient of the Golden Rose Award and the Virginia Writers' Club's poetry prize.

Life
Nancy Byrd Turner was born in Boydton, Virginia, July 29, 1880. She was the eldest child of Rev. Byrd Thornton and Nancy Turner.

In 1898, she graduated from Hannah More Academy in Maryland and began work as a teacher. During this period her work appeared in several national magazines including the Saturday Evening Post and Scribner'''s.

In 1917, she moved to Boston to join the editorial staff of The Youth's Companion. By 1922 she was an editor for The Atlantic, The Independent, and Houghton Mifflin. She joined the MacDowell art colony in 1925 and remained there until 1944.

Her first book of poetry, A Riband on My Rein, was published in 1929. Over the course of her career she published 15 books, ranging from adult poetry to children's literature and lyrics. Her work appeared in England and in the United States in such magazines as Good Housekeeping, Harper's Magazine, Ladies' Home Journal, and the New Yorker.

She retired to Ashland, Virginia, to become a lecturer and freelance writer. She died September 5, 1971.

Awards
 1930 Golden Rose Award, of the New England Poetry Society.
 1948 Virginia Writers' Club's poetry prize

Works
 
 

Poetry
 
 A Riband on My Rein'', 1929
   reprint 2008 (illustrated by Winifred Bromhall)

References

External links
 
 

1880 births
1971 deaths
20th-century American poets
American editors
American women poets
20th-century American women writers
People from Boydton, Virginia
Poets from Virginia
People from Ashland, Virginia